Any Other Way may refer to:

"Any Other Way", song by William Bell (singer), W. Bell, 1962, covered by Jackie Shane, Chuck Jackson and Bruce Springsteen.
"Any Other Way", song by B.B. King, C. Otis, from Guess Who (album)
"Any Other Way", song by The Zombies from Breathe Out, Breathe In
"Any Other Way", song by We The Kings from Somewhere Somehow (album)
"(If There Was) Any Other Way", a 1990 song by Celine Dion from Unison